Czamanin  is a village in the administrative district of Gmina Topólka, within Radziejów County, Kuyavian-Pomeranian Voivodeship, in north-central Poland.

References

Czamanin
Pomeranian Voivodeship (1919–1939)